Knurr Log House is a historic home located at Delphi in Lower Frederick Township, Montgomery County, Pennsylvania.  The log house was built about 1750, and is a -story, Germanic log dwelling.  It has a gable roof and traditional three room first floor plan.  Also on the property are a 19th-century bank barn, two chicken houses, a corn crib, and tool and wood shed.

It was added to the National Register of Historic Places in 1973.

Gallery

References

Houses on the National Register of Historic Places in Pennsylvania
Houses completed in 1750
Houses in Montgomery County, Pennsylvania
National Register of Historic Places in Montgomery County, Pennsylvania